Gabriel Pellon (1900–1975) was a German painter and art director. Pellon was born in Metz, which was then part of the German Empire having been annexed from France at the end of the Franco-Prussian War. When Metz was later annexed by France, Pellon settled in Germany where he established himself as a leading designer of film sets.

Selected filmography
 The Merry Wives of Vienna (1931)
 The Night Without Pause (1931)
 A City Upside Down (1933)
 The Man Who Couldn't Say No (1938)
 Little County Court (1938)
 The Unfaithful Eckehart (1940)
 The Bath in the Barn (1943)
 Martina (1949)
 One Night Apart (1950)
 The Woman from Last Night (1950)
 The Black Forest Girl (1950)
 Don't Ask My Heart (1952)
 Three Days of Fear (1952)
 Have Sunshine in Your Heart (1953)
 Everything for Father (1953)
 Diary of a Married Woman (1953)
 We'll Talk About Love Later (1953)
 My Sister and I (1954)
 The Big Star Parade (1954)
 The Great Test (1954)
 Love, Dance and a Thousand Songs (1955)
 The Star of Rio (1955)
 Fruit in the Neighbour's Garden (1956)
 Where the Ancient Forests Rustle (1956)
 My Sixteen Sons (1956)
 Beloved Corinna (1956)
 The Mad Bomberg (1957)
 The Copper (1958)

References

Bibliography
 Shandley, Robert. Rubble Films: German Cinema In Shadow Of the Third Reich. Temple University Press, 2010.

External links

1900 births
1975 deaths
German art directors
People from Metz